Jhonnes Marques de Souza (born 22 April 1984) is a Brazilian football defender who last played for ViOn Zlaté Moravce in the Fortuna Liga.

Biography
Born in Londrina, Paraná, Jhonnes was signed by Londrina Junior Team in 2004, the youth team of Londrina (later became two separate entity). He also trailed at Serie A team Udinese but failed to sign a contract, as Italian clubs were restricted to sign any non-EU player.

Slovenia
In September 2004 he left for Slovenian side Domžale along with Juninho. In February 2005, his contract with Londrina Junior Team was extended to 31 December 2008 and Lucas also joined him at Domžale. He played 20 league matches in 2005–06 season. In 2006–07 season he left for Celje. In January 2007, his contract with Londrina Junior Team was extended again, to 31 December 2011.

Returned to Brazil
In January 2008. he joined Náutico. and in February left for Treze. He also trailed at German side TuS Koblenz in January 2009, played a friendly.

In February 2009, he was signed by Londrina. In April, he was signed by Arapongas.

Return to Europe
He was loaned to Croatian side Hrvatski dragovoljac in August 2009.

In August 2010, he finally terminated his contract with Junior Team Futebol (ex-Londrina Junior Team) and left for Latvia side Liepājas Metalurgs, played 8 times and scored 2 goals in Latvian Higher League.

In February 2011, he signed a contract with Újpest FC. and in September 2011 he signed for NK Varaždin.

References

External links
 Profile at imscouting.com

1984 births
Living people
Brazilian footballers
Londrina Esporte Clube players
Clube Náutico Capibaribe players
NK Hrvatski Dragovoljac players
Újpest FC players
NK Varaždin players
FC Tobol players
FC ViOn Zlaté Moravce players
Slovak Super Liga players
Kazakhstan Premier League players
Brazilian expatriate footballers
Expatriate footballers in Slovenia
Expatriate footballers in Croatia
Expatriate footballers in Latvia
Expatriate footballers in Hungary
Expatriate footballers in Slovakia
Expatriate footballers in Kazakhstan
Expatriate footballers in Italy
Brazilian expatriate sportspeople in Slovenia
Brazilian expatriate sportspeople in Croatia
Brazilian expatriate sportspeople in Latvia
Brazilian expatriate sportspeople in Hungary
Brazilian expatriate sportspeople in Slovakia
Brazilian expatriate sportspeople in Kazakhstan
Brazilian expatriate sportspeople in Italy
Association football central defenders
Sportspeople from Londrina